Tanta University is an Egyptian university in the city of Tanta, Al Gharbiyah governorate, Egypt. The university is under the direct scientific supervision of the Ministry of Higher Education.

It was founded first in 1962 as a branch from the University of Alexandria with the faculty of Medicine only and then it became an independent university named University of the Middle Delta in 1972. It had at that time Medicine, Science, Agriculture and Education faculties. Then, its name was changed into Tanta University in 1973.

Faculties
 Faculty of Medicine (1962)
 Faculty of Science (1977)
 Faculty of Education in Tanta (1977)
 Faculty of Agriculture in Kafr ash Shaykh (1977)
 Faculty of Engineering (1977)
 Faculty of Law (1981)
 High Institute of Nursing (1982)
 Faculty of Veterinary Medicine (1982)
 Faculty of Agriculture in Tanta (1992)
 Faculty of Physical Education (1994)
 Faculty of Dentistry (1977)
 Faculty of Pharmacy
 Faculty of Arts (1975)
 Faculty of Computer and Informatics
 Faculty of Commerce

The University's branch in Kafr ash Shaykh
The university's branch in Kafr ash Shaykh was constituted in 1983. It has Education, Agriculture, Specific Education, Veterinary Medicine, Commerce, Engineering and Arts faculties.

In 2006, Kafr ash Shaykh branch separated from the Tanta university to become an independent university under the name of Kafr ash Shaykh University in Kafr ash Shaykh city and it now has Education, Agriculture, Specific Education, Veterinary Medicine, Commerce, Engineering, Physical Education and Arts faculties.

Number of students

Notable alumni
 Abd El-Fatah Abomohra
 Eman Ghoneim
 Nabil Farouk
 Ahmad Khaled Tawfeq

See also
 Education in Egypt
 Egyptian universities
 List of Egyptian universities

References

External links
 Tanta University website

 
Educational institutions established in 1962
1962 establishments in Egypt
Universities in Egypt